Daniel Hayward Veatch (born April 18, 1965) is an American former competition swimmer who represented the United States at the 1988 Olympics in Seoul, South Korea.  Veatch competed in his signature event, the men's 200-meter backstroke, finishing seventh in the event final.  He won the 200-meter backstroke at the Pan Pacific Games in Brisbane in 1987 and again in Tokyo in 1989.  He pulled his hamstring just before the U.S. Trials for the 1992 Summer Olympics and so missed those Games.

He is openly gay, and lives in San Francisco. Veatch was the first masters swimmer to reach 6000 yards in one hour.

See also
 List of World Aquatics Championships medalists in swimming (men)
 List of Princeton University Olympians
 List of Princeton University people

References

1965 births
Living people
American male backstroke swimmers
Gay sportsmen
American LGBT sportspeople
LGBT swimmers
LGBT people from Maryland
Olympic swimmers of the United States
People from Potomac, Maryland
Princeton Tigers men's swimmers
Swimmers at the 1988 Summer Olympics
Swimmers at the 1991 Pan American Games
World Aquatics Championships medalists in swimming
Pan American Games silver medalists for the United States
Pan American Games medalists in swimming
Medalists at the 1991 Pan American Games
20th-century American LGBT people
21st-century American LGBT people